Hogan Lowndes Yancey (October 1, 1881 – March 7, 1960) was an American football and baseball player and attorney. He was a one-time mayor of Lexington, Kentucky. Yancey attended Transylvania University (then Kentucky University). Yancey was a second-team All-Southern fullback on the football team. He played baseball in the minor leagues for several teams.

Head coaching record

References

External links
 
 

1881 births
1960 deaths
20th-century American lawyers
American football fullbacks
Binghamton Bingoes players
Birmingham Barons players
Hartford Senators players
Jacksonville Jays players
Lexington Colts players
Rochester Bronchos players
Savannah Pathfinders players
Scranton Miners players
Toronto Maple Leafs (International League) players
Transylvania Pioneers athletic directors
Transylvania Pioneers baseball players
Transylvania Pioneers football coaches
Transylvania Pioneers football players
College men's track and field athletes in the United States
Mayors of Lexington, Kentucky
Players of American football from Lexington, Kentucky
Baseball players from Lexington, Kentucky
Coaches of American football from Kentucky